Eudasyphora canadiana is a species of fly.

Distribution
Alaska to Labrador, south to Oregon, Indiana

References

Muscidae
Diptera of North America
Insects described in 1980